This article shows all participating team squads at the 2007 FIVB Volleyball Men's World Cup, held from November 18 to December 2, 2007, in several cities in Japan.

Head Coach: Jon Uriarte

Head Coach: Russell Borgeaud

Head Coach: Bernardo Rezende

Head Coach: Martin Stoev

Head Coach: Ahmed Zakaria

Head Coach: Tatsuya Ueta

Head Coach: Carlos Cardona

Head Coach: Vladimir Alekno

Head Coach: Yoo Jung-Tak

Head Coach: Marcelo Méndez

Head Coach: Antonio Giaccobbe

Head Coach: Hugh McCutcheon

References
FIVB

F
S